Levens is a commune in the Alpes-Maritimes département in the Provence-Alpes-Côte d'Azur region in southeastern France.

Its inhabitants are called Levensans (or Levensois).

Origin and evolution of the name
There are three possible explanations of the origin of the name:
From the name of the Leponti tribe, which was changed to Leventi during the Roman period;
From the name of a notable Roman figure, Laevinus;
From the Ligurian word stem lev, indicating a sloping landscape;

Geography
The village, built on high rocky ground, is located at an altitude of 600 metres. It lies in the centre of the district, which stretches from the plain of the Var (Plan-du-Var hamlet) to the Férion range. Mount Férion is 1,400 metres high.

History
 Before the Christian era, the first inhabitants mentioned in history are called the Lépontiens, one of the numerous Ligurian tribes. The name Léponti became Leventi under the Romans, then Leventio in the Middle Ages, Levenzo during the Italian era, to become the current Levens.
 Romans chose the Prés (meadow) quarter, one of the most beautiful in the district, when they set up houses and founded the town. They constructed a cobbled mule track going from Cimiez to Saint-Martin-Lantosque crossing through Levens.
 In 407, Leventi suffered badly from the invasion of the County of Nice by a Vandal horde which had crossed over the Rhine with Alans and Sueves Vandals which would cross into Spain in 409 and to North Africa in 429.
 The present village is constructed around the old feudal castle erected by the counts of Provence after the collapse of the Roman Empire.
 At the end of the 14th century, the destiny of Levens was linked to the whole County of Nice, which parted with Provence to form an alliance with Savoy on the initiative of the powerful John All Saints' Day, baron of Beuil, whose eldest son later became lord of Levens. The dedication act was signed on 28 September 1388, in front of the Saint-Pons monastery.
 A plague epidemic in 1467 devastated much of the county's population.
 On 8 January 1475, Louis Grimaldi, lord of Levens and descendant of John, allowed the inhabitants a 'liberty charter', conferring on them the right to vote for their own councilmen, and getting rid of the annual "cut" (local tax) of 40 gold florins to be paid to Grimaldi on All Saints' Day.
 John II Grimaldi, inducted into the fiefdom of Levens on 15 May 1543, took an oath of fealty to the Duke of Savoy Emmanuel Philibert, only to immediately betray him and fight with the Franco-Turkish troops during the siege of Nice. Convicted of treason, John II was condemned to banishment and seizure of his goods. By an act dated 22 October 1550, the inhabitants of Leventio purchased directly from their Savoyard overlord the flour mills and deficis (olive oil mills) for 1,200 gold Italian crowns. However, after a 14-year period of roaming and making amends, John II's title deeds were restored to him on 8 December 1557, provoking anger among the inhabitants and making the Grimaldi family unpopular for a while.
 The parish church received imposing alteration works between 1610 and 1615.
 Annibal Grimaldi, Count of Beuil and governor of County of Nice, maintained political relations with his French neighbours and was in favor of giving the county to France. The Duke of Savoy Charles Emmanuel then revoked Annibal's command and ordered him and his son André to follow the Duke to the Turin court. When they instead returned to their lands, Charles-Emmanuel considered them rebels. As they were not supported by Louis XIII, the king of France who had just married his sister Christine to Charles-Emmanuel's son Victor Amédée, Annibal Grimaldi and his son were convicted of lese-majesté, rebellion and perfidy, and were sentenced to death in absentia, following a series of protracted proceedings. The Count of Beuil shut himself up in his castle of Tourettes-Revest, which was immediately besieged by Savoyard troops. He was strangled to death on 9 January 1621.
 At the time of these incidents between the overlord and his vassal, the lord of Levens was César Grimaldi. The inhabitants still remembered the return of John II, and the youth were not quick to forget that the Count of Beuil had written an act forbidding any public festivities without permission of the lord. When hearing of Annibal's end, César and his family fled to Cabris; the Levensans promptly sacked the castle, placed a boutàu (a stone for jumping over) and danced the farandole around and over it, screaming: "We jump over the Grimaldis' belly!" The day after, the Duke of Savoy favourably accepted a letter from the Levensans, affirming their devotion to Savoy. In return, Charles-Emmanuel granted a charter of liberty to Levens which became comtesse d'elle-même (self-ruling). On 16 October 1622, the order was given to destroy the battlements surrounding the castle.
 During the dark years of the Revolutionary period, Levens, along with the whole County, suffered many violent acts of the French occupying army and the  counter-revolutionary movement. On 29 September 1792, General d'Anselme entered the city of Nice. On 17 October 1792, the 1,150 soldiers commanded by Brigadier Paul de Barral seized Levens, then marched toward Duranus and Lantosque. The future Marshal of France André Masséna, born in Nice and brought up in the Siga and Serret family houses in Levens itself, was part of this occupying troop.

Population

Administration

Tourism
Levens is one of sixteen villages grouped together by the Métropole Nice Côte d'Azur tourist department as the Route des Villages Perchés (Route of Perched Villages). The others are: Aspremont, Carros, Castagniers, Coaraze, Colomars, Duranus, Èze, Falicon, La Gaude, Lantosque, La Roquette-sur-Var, Saint-Blaise, Saint-Jeannet, Tourrette-Levens and Utelle.

Sights
 The peira tourgnola (turning stone) is a vertical stone several meters high, topped with a second block measuring about 1 meter high, situated on the path to Albarea, near the fork in the path to Coumba.
 With the gate of the first outer walls and the one of the second outer walls (the 'Portal'), the 'tower' is one of the three remains of the old castle. This tower is the old donjon, the highest point of the village, which overhangs the public swimming pool below, and offers a distant view over the plain of the Var and the cape of Antibes.
 The boutàu is a cylindrical cone-shaped and truncated stone, which was placed in the ground at the current Liberty Place and over which the farandole dancers jumped during the revolt of 1621.
 The Saint-Antonin parish church is mentioned as far back as 1286 on the Saint-Pons' abbey Cartulary. Construction of the first church was probably prior to the 13th century, but it has been affected by numerous revisions, particularly at the beginning of the 17th century. It is built according to a basilica plan, with a 4-bay nave and two side aisles; the chancel and the two side aisles are closed with flat chevets. These three aisles are separated by two 4-pillar rows, made of local grey limestone. The bases of the pillars comprise curious heads of a late Roman style, very diversified, among which is a "Levens smile"! Three pieces, including a polychrome wooden statue of the Virgin, a pulpit and predella telling Saint Antonin's life, date to the 16th century.
 The Chapel for the White Penitents Brotherhood founded at the beginning of the 14th century, called 'White Chapel', was consecrated to Our Lady of the Assumption, shifted and rebuilt on its present location (Republic Place) in 1775. It contains a polychrome altar piece dated to the 18th century, an alabaster 'Virgin and Child' dated to the 17th century, and a polychrome wooden processional Virgin statue dated to the 18th century.
 The Chapel for the Black Penitents Brotherhood was founded at the end of the 16th century; it is called 'Black Chapel'. The treasure house of the Levens church is presented here, within the scope of a religious art museum.

Personalities
 Pierre Giletta (end 16th century - beginning 17th century) was a secular priest and teacher of theology at Nice's college, prefect of the ducal house. In 1608 he published a Déclaration de foi (declaration of faith) in Thonon—a book against the Calvinists, redacted in French.
 François Malausséna (1814 Levens - 1882 Nice), lawyer at the bar of Nice, mayor of Nice, president of the conseil général of the Alpes-Maritimes.
 Frédéric Maurandi (1863 Levens - 1943 Massoins), primary school teacher. He published Les Annales de Levens (The Annals of Levens) in 1931.
 Victor Tiranty (1750 Levens - 1835 Nice), jurist, notary and businessman, member of the Société populaire. A defender of France and the Revolution, he protested against the behaviour of General d'Anselme and his troops.

See also
Communes of the Alpes-Maritimes department

References

External links

  Levens' anthem.
  Some chimes and knells from the County of Nice: tirignoun (chime) and clar (knell) from Levens.

Communes of Alpes-Maritimes
Alpes-Maritimes communes articles needing translation from French Wikipedia